Raymond James Flacke (born February 11, 1948) is a country guitar session player from Milford on Sea, England. He has graced countless recordings with his trademark ‘‘Tele-wielding Chicken pickin’’’ style for such artists as Emmylou Harris, Janie Frickie, Kathy Mattea, Lacy J. Dalton, Marty Stuart, Patty Loveless, Ricky Skaggs and Travis Tritt.

As an educator
Flacke has been at the forefront of sharing his guitar styles and technique for such music publishing companies as Hal Leonard Corporation, Homespun Tapes and Star Licks Productions.

Discography

Solo albums
Untitled Island
Songs Without Words

Featured appearances

References

English country guitarists
English rock guitarists
English male guitarists
Living people
People from Milford on Sea
1948 births